The Treaty of Lisbon, if the date is unspecified, usually refers to a 2007 treaty between member states designed to reform the European Union.

Treaty of Lisbon may also refer to:
Treaty of Lisbon (1667), a Franco-Portuguese alliance during the Portuguese Restoration War
Treaty of Lisbon (1668), a peace treaty that ended the Portuguese Restoration War between Portugal and Spain, granting independence to Portugal
Treaty of Lisbon (1859), a treaty between Portugal and the Netherlands on the border between Portuguese Timor and the Dutch East Indies
Treaty of Lisbon (1864), a treaty between Spain and Portugal on the border between the two countries

See also
Lisbon Agreement (disambiguation)

fr:Traité de Lisbonne